Elm Green Preparatory School is a day school which takes boys and girls from 4 to 11. Many pupils move on at 11 to local grammar schools, others to day independent or maintained schools, with a few taking up places at boarding schools. The Headmistress, Ann Milner, is a member of the Incorporated Association of Prep. Schools and the school is a member of ISCis.

Notable former pupils

Anya Hindmarch, designer
Alex Dowsett, Commonwealth silver medallist

Preparatory schools in Essex